Walter Peter Stanowski (April 28, 1919 – June 28, 2015) was a Canadian ice hockey defenceman. He was born in Winnipeg, Manitoba.

Stanowski started his National Hockey League career with the Toronto Maple Leafs in 1939. In 1941, he was a member of the NHL All-Star team. He won four Stanley Cups with the Maple Leafs. Stanowski was traded to the New York Rangers after the 1947-48 season. He retired after the 1951 season.

Stanowski was the last surviving member of Maple Leafs 1942 and 1945 Stanley Cup team.

As of 2015, Stanowski lived in a retirement home near Toronto. He died on June 28, 2015. At the time of his death, Stanowski was the oldest surviving Maple Leaf.

On October 14, 2016, Stanowski was named by the Maple Leafs as #66 of the one hundred greatest players in team history.

Personal life
Wally's son Skip played for Cornell, winning a national title in 1967.

Awards and achievements
Turnbull Cup MJHL Championship (1938)
Memorial Cup Championship (1938)
NHL first All-Star team (1941)
Stanley Cup Championships (1942, 1945, 1947, & 1948)
Played in NHL All-Star Game (1947)
Inducted into the Manitoba Sports Hall of Fame and Museum in 2004
"Honoured Member" of the Manitoba Hockey Hall of Fame

Career statistics

References

External links

 Wally Stanowski’s biography at Manitoba Sports Hall of Fame and Museum
Wally Stanowski’s biography at Manitoba Hockey Hall of Fame

1919 births
2015 deaths
Canadian military personnel of World War II
Canadian ice hockey defencemen
New York Rangers players
St. Boniface Seals players
Ice hockey people from Winnipeg
Stanley Cup champions
Toronto Maple Leafs players
Canadian expatriates in the United States